Bookanakere Yediyurappa Vijayendra is an Indian politician who is currently the State Vice President of Bharatiya Janata party of Karnataka from 2020. He is the son of former Chief Minister of Karnataka, B. S. Yediyurappa. He previously served as the General secretary of the Karnataka unit of the Bharatiya Janata Yuva Morcha. He is a Lawyer by education and previously had a brief stint as an advocate. His brother B. Y. Raghavendra is a member of Parliament from Shimoga Lok Sabha constituency.

See also

 B. S. Yediyurappa

References

External links

People from Shimoga district
Living people
Bharatiya Janata Party politicians from Karnataka
21st-century Indian lawyers
Year of birth missing (living people)